Mechanics National Bank may refer to:

 Mechanics National Bank (Philadelphia), founded 1809
 Mechanics National Bank (New York City), founded 1810
 Mechanics National Bank (New Britain), where Philip Corbin served as Director